Beresfield railway station is located on the Main Northern line in New South Wales, Australia. It opened on 31 July 1925, serving the western Newcastle suburb of Beresfield.

History
Beresfield railway station opened on 31 July 1925.

1997 collision
On 23 October 1997, Beresfield was the site of a major rail accident, when a FreightCorp coal train passed a red signal and collided with the rear of another coal train standing on the same track. Six people were injured, including the station master and a passenger who jumped from the platform moments before the collision. The crash resulted in dozens of coal wagons tumbling over the platform and across the tracks, blocking all four tracks and destroying most of the station. Three 82 class locomotives were destroyed.

In 2002, Beresfield was fully redeveloped, receiving new easy-access facilities, station signage and booking office.

Platforms & services
Beresfield has one island platform with two faces. It is serviced by NSW TrainLink Hunter Line services travelling from Newcastle to Maitland, Muswellbrook, Scone, Telarah and Dungog.

References

External links

Beresfield station details Transport for New South Wales
Beresfield rail accident gallery

Easy Access railway stations in New South Wales
Railway accidents and incidents in New South Wales
Railway accidents in 1997
Railway stations in the Hunter Region
Railway stations in Australia opened in 1925
Regional railway stations in New South Wales
Train collisions in Australia
1997 disasters in Australia